George and Rosemary is a 1987 animated short co-directed by Alison Snowden and David Fine, about two "golden agers" who prove that passion is not exclusively for the young.

Storyline
George, an old dreamer, has a secret love for the woman directly next door to him. However, while he can sweep her off her feet in his imagination; actually doing it is a different matter. So he stays at his home as he works to build up the gumption to see her.

Production
Produced by Eunice Macaulay for the National Film Board of Canada, the film was narrated by Cec Linder.

Accolades
The film received the Genie Award for Best Short Film and was nominated for an Academy Award for Best Animated Short Film at the 60th Academy Awards. It was also included in the Animation Show of Shows.

See also
Bob's Birthday
Bob and Margaret

References

External links
Watch George and Rosemary at NFB.ca

1987 films
Best Theatrical Short Film Genie and Canadian Screen Award winners
1987 animated films
1980s animated short films
Films about old age
Films directed by Alison Snowden and David Fine
National Film Board of Canada animated short films
English-language Canadian films
1980s Canadian films